The Linden Centre (喜林苑) is a boutique hotel and center for cultural exchange located in Xizhou, Yunnan in Southwest China. The original location is in a renovated Bai style courtyard home, one of Xizhou's heritage sites protected at the national level. The site itself was first constructed in 1948 and has changed hands several times until Brian and Jeanee Linden began renovations in 2007. The hotel has one courtyard with facilities for public use like a library with a large collection of Chinese and English books and two private courtyards housing 14 guest rooms.

History
A businessman from Xizhou named Yang Pinxiang (杨品相) became very wealthy in the early 1900s from trading silk, tea, and dyes on the Tea Horse Road and built a luxurious home in eastern Xizhou. Mr. Yang was educated in Shanghai and incorporated styles from eastern China into his traditionally inspired Bai courtyard home, along with custom facades inspired by Xizhou artists who studied overseas.

After the Communist Revolution in 1949, Mr. Yang's home was turned over for military use as a barracks for several years and housed over 100 soldiers. Decades later during the Cultural Revolution (1966 - 1976) the building was repurposed as a military hospital. Although many historical structures and homes of opulence in China suffered devastating damage or were destroyed altogether during this era, Mr. Yang's home was spared due to its continued use by the Chinese military. The site changed hands again in the 1990s and became a kindergarten for over a decade.

Mr. Yang's home became protected at the Yunnan provincial level in 1987, and gained a nationally protected status in 2001.

The property today is managed and operated by two Americans, Brian and Jeanee Linden, who are the only foreigners to have possession of a nationally protected heritage site in China. They have been operating the site as The Linden Centre since renovations began in 2007.

Renovations
The property has been continuously occupied and has changed hands several times since 1948, with very little structural upkeep until renovations began in 2007. Along with necessary safety installations (pipes replaced, fire extinguishers installed) the Linden Centre added glass ceilings to protect original artwork from the wind, rain, and sun damage, re-levelled floors and walkways, and restored the original living spaces.

Description

Although the site has been renovated and refurnished, all of the wall art, reflecting walls, structure, and facades are original. The style is typical for its era of construction, this time is characterized as an economic boom in Xizhou and many large courtyard homes were built in a similar size and with the same attention to detail.

The Linden Centre's main courtyard and facilities are open to the public while the second, third, and exterior courtyard are for the hotel's guests.

Locations
In 2013 and 2015, the Linden Centre expanded to renovate and restore two other nationally protected heritage sites in Xizhou. Yang Zhuoran (杨卓然) and Bao Chengfu (宝成府) are two other properties built in the same era and in a similar style. Yang Zhuoran is composed of dorms, classrooms, and a library, serving as a facility for education programs while Bao Chengfu has 14 guest rooms, but highlights its public space and facilities for community involvement.

Gallery

References

External links
 

Hotels in China
Buildings and structures in Dali Bai Autonomous Prefecture